Town-class cruiser can refer to: 

 Town-class cruiser (1910)
 Town-class cruiser (1936)

See also
 Town-class destroyer